Shakhovsky or Shakhovskoy ( or ; masculine), Shakhovskaya (feminine), or Shakhovskoye is the name of several inhabited localities in Russia:

Urban localities
Shakhovskaya, Moscow Oblast, a work settlement in Shakhovskoy District of Moscow Oblast

Rural localities
Shakhovsky (rural locality), a settlement in Mosalsky District of Kaluga Oblast
Shakhovskoye, Kurkinsky District, Tula Oblast, a village in Ivanovskaya Volost of Kurkinsky District of Tula Oblast
Shakhovskoye, Uzlovsky District, Tula Oblast, a selo in Krasnolesskaya Rural Administration of Uzlovsky District of Tula Oblast
Shakhovskoye, Ulyanovsk Oblast, a selo in Shakhovsky Rural Okrug of Pavlovsky District of Ulyanovsk Oblast
Shakhovskaya, Irkutsk Oblast, a village in Alarsky District of Irkutsk Oblast

See also
Shakhovsky (surname)
 Shakhovskoy surname